Charles Kenneth Anton Benda (3 June 1902 – 26 July 1978) was an English actor often on television. He appeared in British television series No Hiding Place, The Saint, The Avengers, Z-Cars, The Prisoner, Doctor Who, Doomwatch and films The Private Life of Sherlock Holmes, The Ruling Class, Horror Hospital, The Adventure of Sherlock Holmes' Smarter Brother, The Strange Case of the End of Civilization as We Know It, International Velvet and others. His stage appearances included small roles at The Old Vic and with Peter Hall's National Theatre company.

Private life
Benda was the son of Charles Benda, a company director and merchant dealing in Oriental Goods. His grandparents, Anton Benda and his wife Frances Mandelbaum, both originally from the Kingdom of Bavaria, were naturalized as British subjects, and in the census of 1871 his grandfather was described as a foreign agent.

On 2 June 1932, at St Peter’s, Cranley Gardens, he married Lucy Evelyn Alston, a daughter of Sir Beilby Alston. Their daughter Rosemary Evelyn was born in 1936. In 1960, she married Robert Calder-Smith and they had two daughters and three sons, Henrietta, Anthony, Victoria, Dominic and Benjamin.

Benda retired to the Old Vicarage, Crondall, near Farnham, Surrey, where he died in July 1978. His widow survived him until 1991. Both are buried at Crondall.

Acting credits

References

External links

1902 births
1978 deaths
English male stage actors
English male film actors
English male television actors